Dickerson is a passenger rail station on the MARC Brunswick Line between Washington, D.C., and Martinsburg, WV (with an extension to Frederick, MD). This station was designed by E. Francis Baldwin and built by the Baltimore and Ohio Railroad in 1891. It is the last station Frederick bound trains pass before branching onto the Frederick Branch.

Station layout
The station is not compliant with the Americans with Disabilities Act of 1990, lacking raised platforms for level boarding.

See also
Frederick Branch (Baltimore and Ohio Railroad)

References

External links
 Dickerson station official website
 Dickerson MARC station (Road and Rail Pictures)

Brunswick Line
Railway stations in Montgomery County, Maryland
Former Baltimore and Ohio Railroad stations
MARC Train stations